Rohrbach am Gießhübel is a village in the district of Heilbronn in Baden-Württemberg, Germany. Since 1 December 1971 it has been incorporated into Eppingen.

References

Villages in Baden-Württemberg
Eppingen